Mari Possa is a Salvadoran American pornographic actress and reality TV personality.

Early life

Possa was born in San Miguel, El Salvador. Her family moved from El Salvador to the United States when she was nine.

Career
Mari Possa was a former secretary at a law firm when she entered the adult industry as assistant of director Seymour Butts. In 2003, she became a contract girl for Seymour Butts Home Movies and Adam & Eve Pictures, and appeared in about 35 scenes until 2009. In 2009, Possa retired from the porn industry to pursue a degree in broadcasting, then made her comeback to porn in 2012 as a freelance performer for solo and lesbian scenes. Possa also appeared in the Showtime TV series Family Business and was the cover girl of the book Dirty Talk: Conversations with Porn Stars by Andrew J. Rausch and Chris Watson. Her porn name is a pun on the word mariposa, which means "butterfly" in Spanish.

Awards
2005 AVN Award nominee – Best Group Sex Scene, Video – Anal Surprise Party
2006 AVN Award nominee – Best Threeway Sex Scene – House of Ass
2006 AVN Award nominee – Best All-Girl Sex Scene, Video – War of the Girls
2007 AVN Award nominee – Best Group Sex Scene, Video – Butt Pirates of the Caribbean
2009 AVN Award nominee – Best Threeway Sex Scene – Jenna 9.5
 2013 XBIZ Award nomination – Performer Comeback of the Year

References

External links
 
 
 

1980 births
Salvadoran emigrants to the United States
American pornographic film actresses
Living people
21st-century American women